is a train station in Ikoma, Nara Prefecture, Japan.

Lines 
Kintetsu
Ikoma Line

Surrounding Area 
 
 
 
 Chikurin-ji

Bus
 Ikoma City Community Bus "Takemaru" (Minami-Ikoma Eki Bus stop)

Adjacent stations

References

Railway stations in Japan opened in 1926
Railway stations in Nara Prefecture